Pailin is a province in western Cambodia at the northern edge of the Cardamom Mountains near the border of Thailand. This province is surrounded by Battambang province, and was officially carved out of Battambang to become a separate administrative division after the surrender of the Ieng Sary faction of the Khmer Rouge in 1996. Pailin is known to much of the world for having long been a stronghold of the Khmer Rouge, remaining under their control long after they were defeated in 1979 and serving from 1994 to 1998 as the capital of the Provisional Government of National Union and National Salvation of Cambodia. Within Cambodia, Pailin is known for its natural resources, namely precious gems and timber.

Once a part of the powerful Khmer Empire, Pailin was conquered in 1558 by the Burmese under Bayinnaung and later ruled by the Siamese (Thai) until 1907 and from 1941 to 1946 when it was returned to Cambodia. It was known to the Thai as "Phailin". There is still a vibrant border crossing point in Pailin. On 22 December 2008, King Norodom Sihamoni signed a Royal Decree that changed the municipalities of Kep, Pailin and Sihanoukville into provinces, as well as adjusting several provincial borders.

History
In the early 1970s, Pailin was a prosperous town stemming from the extensive gem deposits in the surrounding countryside. Because of its resources, it was one of the first cities invaded by the Khmer Rouge when they began their major offensive against the Khmer Republic government. The city offered no resistance and the Khmer Rouge soldiers were greeted as liberators as they marched into town. At this point, the deposed prince Norodom Sihanouk had allied himself with the Khmer Rouge and most residents believed that they were fighting to restore him to power. It was not long though before most residents were rounded up for a forced march to the countryside to work in rice paddies. Those believed to have connections to the government were killed. The Khmer Rouge used proceeds from mining in the Pailin area to fund their offensive and later their government once they gained national power. When the invading People's Army of Vietnam ousted them from power, they retreated to Pailin, where many former Khmer Rouge leaders remain today. It was the capital of the Provisional Government of National Union and National Salvation of Cambodia.

Some leaders went into hiding in fear of punishment for their crimes, although other leaders lived openly in the province. As of September 2007, Pailin's remaining Khmer Rouge leaders were being rounded up to face justice by an international tribunal, including Khieu Samphan and Nuon Chea.

Since the war, Pailin suffered an economic decline and failures of local businesses. However, the now politically stable area is seeing a new wave of tourism focused on its ancient temples, natural forests and wildlife, and especially the precious gem market.

Administration
The province is divided into 1 municipality and 1 district, further divided into 8 communes.

Until 2001 Pailin was part of Battambang Province, then elevated to city/municipal status, and then again to provincial status and thus became an autonomous zone of its own.

Tourist attractions 
Wat Phnom Yat

Built by Shan migrants from Myanmar in 1922, the Wat Phnom Yat is a holy place for worship in the heart of Pailin. It includes an old pagoda, similar to the Kola pagoda.

Wat Rattanak Sophoan

At the foot of Phnom Yat is another pagoda, the Wat Rattanak Sophoan, "a Burmese style pagoda more than 570 years of age". On the walls of the enclosure surrounding the pagoda is a bas-relief depicting the Hindu saga of the churning of the Ocean of Milk.

Culture 

Pailin's culture is distinctly different from most of Khmer culture. Before the Khmer Rouge period, Pailin's culture was predominantly Shan Burmese, and has much in common with that of the country of Thailand and Burma. This affinity is shown in the region's cuisine, dress, temple architecture, festivals and arts. The people of Pailin were predominantly Kola. The Kola people originally migrated from Burma beginning in 1876 (note: Khmer people called the Burmese people, "Kola" or "Pumea"). Another wave of migrants, the Shan (one of the many ethnic minorities of Burma) arrived from Burma in the 1920s. The "Kola" or Burmese immigrants of Pailin are known for their work in the precious gem business, which likely is what attracted them to Pailin. Pailin was synonymous with the Mogok region of Burma, where similar precious gemstones were mined. According to people who are in the gem business, gemstones of Pailin are comparable to the gemstones from the Mogok region in Burma; thus, Khmer people believed the Kola or immigrants from Burma were from the Mogok region of Burma).

There are several dialects spoken locally including Khmer, Shan and Kola. The local Khmer dialect shows influence in tone and pronunciation from the Burmese languages as well as Kham Muang and Mon language.

In Pailin, there are a few different kinds of foods. Kola's food is distinct from Burma's Cuisine as well. The most popular Burmese style one is Kola noodles (មីកុឡា, mee kola) which is a vegetarian noodle dish made from thin rice stick noodles, steamed and cooked with soy sauce and garlic chive, sometimes mixed with some meats and small lobster. Other dishes include Tom yum from Thailand and Mon banana pudding of Burma. These have all spread to other parts of Thailand and Cambodia, but normally in versions that are flavored more sweetly than the Pailin version, especially in Phnom Penh.

The Traditional clothes of Pailin is Longyi, also known as Sarong. The cloth is often sewn into a cylindrical shape. It is worn around the waist, running to the feet. It is held in place by folding fabric over, without a knot. It is also sometimes folded up to the knee for comfort. These traditional "longyi" have about 2 meters of in length of a swan. The cloth is made of cotton and sometimes from silk. Kola men wear ankle-length patterns of checks, plaids or stripes "Longyi" in any kinds of color. The Men always wear their white eingyi shirt which has a mandarin collar and sometimes also wear a traditional jacket called taik-pon over their eingy. It has white, grey, black or terracotta colors. They put the gaung baung turban on their head and on their feet wear simple rubber or velvet slippers.

For Kola women's calf-length longyi are in solid colors, flower prints and many kinds of designs. They soften have a red-based color, with partial stripes or very small checks similar to what Mon wear. They also often have horizontal or vertical stripes at the middle part. Royalty traditionally wore a long dress called "thin-dai" decorated by many threads. It was always worn by a lord's daughter and the king of the province's lady. The Women wears a beautiful blouse and a lovely shirt which is known as eingyi. The shirt is decorated with several colors and many pieces of silver. The shirt also has horizontal or vertical stripes at the middle part in some beauty color. Kola women tie a traditional shawl on their eingyi as well as they put the shawl on their shoulders. Women tie a lovely band on their head and wear beautiful flowers in their hair, allowing their hair to drop as a ponytail above their shoulders. They sometimes took a traditional umbrella made from bamboo with them. The footwear is simple slippers of leather or velvet called Hnyat-phanat.

All of these costumes were shiny with bright colors during celebrations. The clothing is very similar to what is worn by the Shan in Burma.

The houses in Pailin are built from wood, about 8 cm to 1 meter includes a wide door and in the middle of the house, there are the hermitages of Buddha and another spirit house. The Kola People are fond of planting roses in front of their homes.

Economy
The surrounding area was rich in a variety of gemstones which were mined almost clean to support the Khmer Rouge. They also logged the area extensively, creating great environmental damage. Now all you can find is low-quality, cheap, hand-faceted gemstones at the market in downtown Pailin.

Unlike most of Cambodia, Pailin is composed primarily of uplands where little rice is grown. This makes it very difficult for farmers to rely on subsistence agriculture. Crop failures trigger foraging, increasing the number of land mine accidents. Many farmers produce non-traditional crops for the markets, including sesame, mung and soya. In 2003-04 it produced 17,204 tons of maize, the second-highest production in the country.

Traders in Pailin will accept Cambodian riels, US dollars, and Thai baht; US dollars are preferred.

Land mines
Pailin and Cambodia, in general, was extensively mined during the three decades of war and remains home to numerous land mines and unexploded ordnance. People are cautioned to stay on marked roads. De-mining is ongoing with UN help, which brings in some of the few foreigners that the locals encounter.

Health
Interestingly, resistance to Malaria drugs is surprisingly high in Pailin. Resistance first appeared in Pailin on the Cambodian-Thai border and then spread to Africa by the early 1980s. A second and third wave of resistance to a new set of malaria drugs occurred since. The local strain of malaria parasites may have some special properties, or the ecology of the region may have features that boost the rise of resistance.

Notable people
 Rady Mom, US state representative in Massachusetts.

References

External links

 The Cambodian Ministry of Tourism's website for the city of Pailin

 
Municipalities of Cambodia
Provinces of Cambodia